Indo-Aryan peoples are a diverse collection of Indo-European peoples speaking Indo-Aryan languages in the Indian subcontinent. Historically, Aryans  were the Indo-Iranian speaking pastoralists who migrated from Central Asia into South Asia and introduced the Proto-Indo-Aryan language. The Indo-Aryan language speakers are found across South Asia.

History

Proto-Indo-Iranians 

The introduction of the Indo-Aryan languages in the Indian subcontinent was the result of a migration of Indo-Aryan people from Central Asia into the northern Indian subcontinent (modern-day Bangladesh, Bhutan, India, Nepal, Pakistan, and Sri Lanka). These migrations started approximately 1,800 BCE, after the invention of the war chariot, and also brought Indo-Aryan languages into the Levant and possibly Inner Asia. Another group of the Indo-Aryans migrated further westward and founded the Mitanni kingdom in northern Syria; (c. 1500–1300 BC) the other group were the Vedic people. Christopher I. Beckwith suggests that the Wusun, an Indo-European Caucasian people of Inner Asia in antiquity, were also of Indo-Aryan origin.

The Proto-Indo-Iranians, from which the Indo-Aryans developed, are identified with the Sintashta culture (2100–1800 BCE), and the Andronovo culture, which flourished ca. 1800–1400 BCE in the steppes around the Aral Sea, present-day Kazakhstan, Turkmenistan, and Uzbekistan. The Proto-Indo-Aryan split off around 1800–1600 BCE from the Iranians, moved south through the Bactria-Margiana Culture, south of the Andronovo culture, borrowing some of their distinctive religious beliefs and practices from the BMAC, and then migrated further south into the Levant and north-western India. The migration of the Indo-Aryans was part of the larger diffusion of Indo-European languages from the Proto-Indo-European homeland at the Pontic–Caspian steppe which started in the 4th millennia BCE. The GGC, Cemetery H, Copper Hoard, OCP, and PGW cultures are candidates for cultures associated with Indo-Aryans.

The Indo-Aryans were united by shared cultural norms and language, referred to as aryā 'noble'. Over the last four millennia, the Indo-Aryan culture has evolved particularly inside India itself, but its origins are in the conflation of values and heritage of the Indo-Aryan and indigenous people groups of India. Diffusion of this culture and language took place by patron-client systems, which allowed for the absorption and acculturation of other groups into this culture, and explains the strong influence on other cultures with which it interacted.

While the Indo-Aryan linguistic group occupies mainly northern parts of India, genetically, all South Asians across the Indian subcontinent are descendants of a mix of South Asian hunter-gatherers, Iranian hunter-gatherers, and Central Asian steppe pastoralists in varying proportion. Additionally, Austroasiatic and Tibeto-Burmese speaking people contributed to the genetic make-up of South Asia.

Indigenous Aryanism propagates the idea that the Indo-Aryans were indigenous to the Indian subcontinent, and that the Indo-European languages spread from there to central Asia and Europe. Contemporary support for this idea is ideologically driven, and has no basis in objective data and mainstream scholarship.

List of historical Indo-Aryan peoples 

 Anga
 Bahlikas
 Bharatas
 Caidyas
 Dewa
 Gāndhārīs
 Gangaridai
 Kambojas
 Kalinga
 Kasmira
 Kekaya
 Khasas
 Kikata
 Koliya
 Kosala
 Kurus
 Licchavis
 Madra
 Magadhis
 Malavas
 Mallakas
 Mātsyeyas
 Moriya
 Nishadhas
 Odra
 Pakthas
 Panchala
 Paundra
 Puru
 Salva
 Salwa
 Saraswata
 Sauvira
 Shakya
 Sindhu
 Sudra
 Surasena
 Trigarta
 Utkala
 Vanga
 Vatsa
 Vidarbha
 Videha
 Yadava
 Yadu

Contemporary Indo-Aryan people 

 Assamese people
 Awadhi people
 Banjara people
 Bengali people
 Bhil people
 Bhojpuri people 
 Bishnupriya Manipuri people
 Brokpa people
 Chakma people
 Deccani people
 Dhivehi people
 Dogra people
 Garhwali people
 Gujarati people
 Halba people
 Haryanvi people
 Jaunsari people
 Kalash people
 Kashmiri people
 Khas people
 Kho people
 Kohistani people
 Konkani people
 Kumauni people
 Kutchi people
 Magahi people 
 Maithil people
 Marathi people
 Marwari people
 Nagpuria people
 Odia people
 Pashayi people
 Punjabi people
 Rajasthani people
 Romani people
 Rohingya people
 Sadan people
 Saraiki people
 Saurashtra people
 Shina people
 Sindhi people
 Sinhalese people
 Tharu people
 Warli people

See also 

Proto-Indo-Europeans
Indo-Iranians
Dardic peoples
Aryan
Indo-Aryan languages
Indo-Aryan migrations
Indigenous Aryanism
Aryan race
Aryavarta
Dasa
Dravidian peoples
Early Indians
Indian diaspora

References

Sources 

 

 
 
 

 

 

 

 

 

 

 Mallory, JP. 1998. "A European Perspective on Indo-Europeans in Asia". In The Bronze Age and Early Iron Age Peoples of Eastern and Central Asia. Ed. Mair. Washington DC: Institute for the Study of Man.

 

 

 Trubachov, Oleg N., 1999: Indoarica, Nauka, Moscow.

External links 
Horseplay at Harappa – People Fas Harvard – Harvard University (PDF)
A tale of two horses – Frontline

 
Indo-European peoples
 
Ancient peoples of India
Ancient peoples of Pakistan
Ancient peoples of Nepal